Rivière-Verte is a neighbourhood in Edmundston. It held village status prior to 2023.

It is 15 kilometres southeast of downtown Edmundston along the Saint John River and the Green River. The Green River's official French name is Rivière Verte, from which the village takes name.

History

On 1 January 2023, Rivière-Verte was annexed by the city of Edmundston. The community's name remains in official use.

Demographics

Language

Notable people

See also
List of communities in New Brunswick
Little Main Restigouche River

References

Communities in Madawaska County, New Brunswick
Former villages in New Brunswick
Neighbourhoods in Edmundston